Kinausu Dam  is an earthfill dam located in Hokkaido Prefecture in Japan. The dam is used for flood control and irrigation. The catchment area of the dam is 1.7 km2. The dam impounds about 8  ha of land when full and can store 514 thousand cubic meters of water. The construction of the dam was started on 1989 and completed in 2009.

References

Dams in Hokkaido